Juan Riaño y Gayangos (March 24, 1865 – November 18, 1939) was a Spanish diplomat. He served as ambassador to the United States from 1914 until 1926 and had been Dean of the Diplomatic Corps from February 1925 to August 1926.

He was married in 1904 to Alice Ward, a Washington, D.C. socialite and heiress.

References

External links
 

1865 births
1939 deaths
Ambassadors of Spain to the United States
Deans of the Diplomatic Corps to the United States